is a Japanese football player who plays for ReinMeer Aomori on loan from Azul Claro Numazu.

Club statistics
Updated to 23 February 2020.

References

External links

Profile at Kataller Toyama

1992 births
Living people
Kokushikan University alumni
Association football people from Kanagawa Prefecture
Japanese footballers
J3 League players
Japan Football League players
Kataller Toyama players
Veertien Mie players
Suzuka Point Getters players
Azul Claro Numazu players
Association football defenders